The Lampson P. Sherman House is a historic building located in Des Moines, Iowa, United States.  This 2½-story frame dwelling features crossed gables that create a cross shape, shingles in the gable ends, porch and gable end brackets, and turned porch columns.  The property on which it stands is one of ten plats that were owned by Drake University.  The house's significance is attributed to the effect of the University's innovative financing techniques upon the settlement of the area around the campus.  Hoyt Sherman bought the property from the University Land Company in 1885.  The house was built in 1888 and Sherman sold it to his brother Lampson, who was a student at Drake, two years later.  The house remained in the Sherman family until 1904.  It was listed on the National Register of Historic Places in 1988.

References 

Houses completed in 1888
Victorian architecture in Iowa
Houses in Des Moines, Iowa
National Register of Historic Places in Des Moines, Iowa
Houses on the National Register of Historic Places in Iowa